Imed Mhedhebi or Mhadhbi (born 22 March 1976 in Tunis) is a former Tunisian football winger.

He was a member of the Tunisian national team that participated at the 2002 FIFA World Cup and won the 2004 African Cup of Nations.

On January 27, 2007 he played his first Ligue 1 match for Nantes against Lorient

Clubs
1994-2001: Etoile Sahel
2001-2003: Genoa C.F.C.
2003-2004: CS Sfaxien
2004-2005: Etoile Sahel
2005-2007: FC Nantes Atlantique
2007-2009: Stade Tunisien
2009-2010: AS Djerba
2010-2012: AEP Paphos FC

Honours
Tunisia
 Africa Cup of Nations: 2004

References

External links

1976 births
Living people
Footballers from Tunis
Tunisian footballers
Tunisian expatriate footballers
Association football forwards
Étoile Sportive du Sahel players
Genoa C.F.C. players
CS Sfaxien players
FC Nantes players
Stade Tunisien players
Serie B players
Ligue 1 players
Expatriate footballers in France
Expatriate footballers in Italy
2002 FIFA World Cup players
2005 FIFA Confederations Cup players
Tunisia international footballers
2000 African Cup of Nations players
2002 African Cup of Nations players
2004 African Cup of Nations players